Dereium or Dereion, also known as Dera (Δέρα) and Derrhium or Derrhion (Δέρριον), was a town of ancient Laconia. Pausanias writes that it was on Taygetus not far from Lapithaeum, and 20 stadia from Harpleia. Dereium possessed an open image of Artemis Dereatis, and a spring called Anonus.

Its site is unlocated.

References

Populated places in ancient Laconia
Former populated places in Greece
Lost ancient cities and towns